Jerheme Wayne Urban (born November 26, 1980) is an American football coach and former player. He is the head football coach at Trinity University in San Antonio, a position he had held since the 2014 season. Urban played college football as a wide receiver at Trinity and professionally in the National Football League (NFL) with the Seattle Seahawks, Dallas Cowboys, Arizona Cardinals, and Kansas City Chiefs. He was signed by the Seahawks as an undrafted free agent in 2003.

Early years
Urban attended Stroman High School, where he competed in football and track. He accepted a football scholarship from Trinity University San Antonio, an NCAA Division III school. As a freshman, he broke his left hand and was moved from quarterback to wide receiver. As a senior, he led the team with 75 receptions for 1,274 yards and 19 touchdowns. He contributed to the team reaching the Amos Alonzo Stagg Bowl, the NCAA Division III Football Championship game.  Urban holds the school career record for touchdowns (40) and kickoff return yards. He set-single season school records for all-purpose yards, most touchdowns (19), and most touchdowns scored.

In track, he captured 16 conference championships and became the first person in Southern Collegiate Athletic Conference history to receive Male Track and Field Athlete of the Year four years in a row. He also set school or conference records in the 100 metres, 400 metres, 400 metres hurdles, long jump, triple jump, and 4 × 400 metres relay.

In 2019, he was inducted into the Trinity Athletic Hall of Fame.

Professional career

Seattle Seahawks
Urban was signed as an undrafted free agent by the Seattle Seahawks after the 2003 NFL Draft on May 1. He was waived and signed to the practice squad. On December 26, he was promoted to the active roster. He was declared inactive for the season finale and the playoffs.

On September 10, 2004, he was released and signed to the practice squad the next day. He was promoted to the active roster. He appeared in 4 games, registering 7 receptions for 151 yards (19.5-yard avg.). He missed the last 2 games and the playoffs with a foot injury.

On September 13, 2005, he was released. On October 4, he was re-signed for depth purposes. His season was cut short by a re-aggravated left foot stress fracture. On November 8, he was released and placed on injured reserve the next day. He was kept as a member of the team during the 2005 NFC Championship run that saw the Seahawks play in Super Bowl XL. Urban was considered in the media to be the ultimate team player. Seattle Post-Intelligencer sportswriter Jim Moore wrote of Urban's tenure with the Seahawks that he  "...wasn't a good soldier, he was a great one." Quarterback Matt Hasselbeck said of Urban, "Whatever the definition of a Seahawk is, he's it." ESPN's Bill Williamson wrote, "This is an under-the-radar player who always seems to make coaches fall in love with him." On June 2, 2006, he was released as he had problems staying healthy during his time with the Seahawks.

Dallas Cowboys
On October 19, 2006, he was signed to the Dallas Cowboys practice squad. On September 1, 2007, he was released.

Arizona Cardinals
On September 2, 2007, he was claimed off waivers by the Arizona Cardinals. He caught a then career-high 22 receptions for 329 yards and 2 touchdowns, in the NFC Championship year that saw the Cardinals play in Super Bowl XLIII.

In 2008, he set new career marks with 34 catches for 448 yards and four touchdowns. He also contributed 11 tackles on special teams and completed his first pass in the NFL. In 2009, he appeared in 10 games, collecting 18 receptions for 186 yards. He wasn't re-signed after the season.

Kansas City Chiefs
On March 11, 2010, he was signed as a free agent by the Kansas City Chiefs, reuniting with his former coach Todd Haley. On September 4, he was placed on the injured reserve list, with a torn flexor tendon in the ring finger on his right hand. In 2011, he appeared in 6 games (one start), making 4 receptions for 35 yards and one touchdown. He wasn't re-signed after the season.

Coaching career
In 2005, he was a track assistant coach at Trinity University, coaching the long jump, triple jump and javelin. In 2012, he was hired as the defensive backs coach. 

In 2013, he was named the offensive coordinator. On November 21, 2013, he became the Tigers head football coach after the retirement of Steve Mohr, who held the position for 24 years.

In 2022, his Tigers won an NCAA first-round playoff game against Hardin-Simmons, 14-7.  The win marked the first time in two decades (and since his final year playing at the school) that Trinity managed to win a game in the Division III playoffs.

Head coaching record

References

External links
 Trinity profile

1980 births
Living people
American football wide receivers
American male hurdlers
American male long jumpers
American male sprinters
American male triple jumpers
Arizona Cardinals players
Dallas Cowboys players
Kansas City Chiefs players
Seattle Seahawks players
Trinity Tigers football coaches
Trinity Tigers football players
College men's track and field athletes in the United States
College track and field coaches in the United States
People from Victoria, Texas
Coaches of American football from Texas
Players of American football from Texas
Track and field athletes from Texas